This is a list of Canadian stores grouped by type.

Book stores

Aqua Books in Winnipeg, Manitoba (defunct)
Attic Books in London, Ontario
Bakka-Phoenix in Toronto
Bison Books in Winnipeg, Manitoba
Book City in Toronto, Ontario
The Book Room in Halifax, Nova Scotia was, at the time of its 2008 closing, the oldest bookstore in Canada (defunct)
Camas Bookstore and Infoshop in Victoria, British Columbia
Glad Day Bookshop in Toronto, Ontario
Highway Book Shop near Cobalt, Ontario (defunct)
Hyman's Book and Art Shoppe, an independent Jewish bookstore in Toronto, Ontario (defunct)
Indigo Books and Music, Canada's largest bookstore chain, based in Toronto
Little Sister's Book and Art Emporium in Vancouver, British Columbia
McNally Robinson, small independently run chain of stores across Canada
Mondragon Bookstore & Coffeehouse in Winnipeg, Manitoba (defunct)
The Monkey's Paw in Toronto, Ontario
Munro's Books in Victoria, British Columbia
Spartacus Books in Vancouver, British Columbia
This Ain't the Rosedale Library in Toronto, Ontario (defunct)
Toronto Women's Bookstore in Toronto, Ontario (defunct)
The Word Bookstore in Montreal

Clothing stores

Harry Rosen Inc.
Le Chateau
Lululemon
Mark's
Moores
Roots Canada
Tip Top Tailors
Ardene
Aritzia
Bluenotes
Boutique La Vie en Rose
Kit and Ace

Furniture stores

The Brick
Leon's

Shoe stores
Aldo
The Shoe Company

Convenience stores
 Alimentation Couche-Tard
 Becker's
 Dollarama
 Mac's Convenience Stores
 Needs Convenience
 On the Run
 Pioneer Energy
 Provi-Soir
 Quickie Convenience Stores

Department stores

Canadian Tire
Holt Renfrew
Hudson's Bay (retailer) -owned by American group, NRDC Equity Partners
La Maison Simons
Winners - Canadian unit of US based parent TJX
HomeSense - Canadian unit of US based parent TJX
Marshalls - Canadian unit of US based parent TJX
Giant Tiger
Fields
Walmart Canada - Canadian unit of US based parent Walmart

Electronics stores
 Henry's
 The Source
 Staples / Bureau en Gros - Canadian unit of US-based parent
 Telus
 Best Buy - Canadian unit of US-based parent
 GameStop - Canadian unit of US-based parent
 Jump+ - Canadian Apple reseller

Grocery stores

Atlantic Superstore
Bulk Barn
Dominion
Extra Foods
Farm Boy
Food Basics
Fortinos
FreshCo
Freshmart
IGA
Loblaws
Loeb
Longo's
Maxi
Metro
No Frills
Provigo
Rabba
Real Canadian Superstore
Safeway
Save-On-Foods
SaveEasy
Sobeys
Steinberg's (supermarket)
Thrifty Foods
Valu-mart
Your Independent Grocer
Zehrs Markets

Pharmaceutical stores

Brunet
Familiprix
Jean Coutu Group
Lawtons
London Drugs
PharmaChoice
Rexall
Shoppers Drug Mart

Toy and game Stores
The Disney Store - Canadian unit of US-based parent The Children's Place
EB Games - Canadian unit of US-based parent
Mastermind Toys
Toys “R” Us

Home Improvement
 Home Hardware
 The Home Depot
 Réno-Dépôt/Rona
 Lowe's

Linen Stores 
Bed Bath and Beyond

Sport Stores

Sport Check
Atmosphere

List of defunct stores
This is a list of Canadian retail stores that have gone out of existence due to either bankruptcy, a merger or takeover where their name is no longer in use.

A&P - Canadian unit of US-based grocery store chain
Aikenhead's Hardware - hardware store 
Beaver Lumber - hardware/lumber store chain
Blockbuster Video - Canadian unit of US-based video rental shop chain
Bi-Way - discount store chain
Consumers Distributing - catalogue store chain
Dominion - grocery store chain, except Newfoundland
Eagle Hardware & Garden - hardware store
Eaton's - department store chain
Food City - grocery store
Future Shop - electronics retailer
Horizon - department store (possibly owned by Easton)
HMV Canada - videos retailer
Jumbo Video - video rental shop chain
Kmart Department Store - Canadian unit of US-based parent; Canadian stores sold to Zellers
Knob Hill Farms - grocery store chain in Southern Ontario
Kresge - Canadian unit of US-based discount store chain
Les Ailes de la Mode - department store
Metropolitan Stores - variety store chain
Miracle Food Mart - grocery store chain
Miracle Mart - department store
Morgan's - department store
Pascal - hardware/furniture store chain

SAAN Stores - discount stores
Shop-Rite - catalogue store chain
Sears Canada - Canadian unit of US based parent Sears
Simpson's - department store chain
Steinberg's -  grocery store chain
Supercentre - grocery store chain
Tamblyn Drugs - pharmacy chain
Target Canada - department store
Toy City - toy chain owned by Consumers Distributing
Towers - department store chain
Tower Records - Canadian unit of US-based music and entertainment store chain
Wise Stores - department store
Woodward's - department store chain
 Woolworth - Canadian unit of the F. W. Woolworth Company
Woolco - Canadian unit of US-based department store chain
XS Cargo - resold bankrupt/excess stock
Zellers - department store chain. Being revived in 2023 as an e-commerce website and with locations inside existing Hudson's Bay (department store) stores.

See also
 List of superstores
 Supermarkets in Canada

References

Stores
Canada